Darreh Dun or Darrehdun or Darreh-ye Dun may refer to:
 Darreh Dun, Chaharmahal and Bakhtiari
 Darreh Dun, Andika, Khuzestan Province
 Darreh Dun, Ramhormoz, Khuzestan Province